Arthur Tilley may refer to:

 Arthur Augustus Tilley (1851–1942), academic of the University of Cambridge
 Arthur Tilley (footballer) (1892–1984), English football outside right

See also
Arthur Tiley (1910–1994), British businessman and Conservative and National Liberal politician